Anna Lisa Baroni is an Italian politician. She was elected to be a deputy to the Parliament of Italy in the 2018 Italian general election for the Legislature XVIII of Italy.

Career
Baroni was born on October 20, 1959, in Mantua.

She was elected to the Italian Parliament in the 2018 Italian general election, to represent the district of Lombardy for the Forza Italia party.

References

Living people
Forza Italia politicians
Forza Italia (2013) politicians
1959 births
Deputies of Legislature XVIII of Italy
Politicians from Mantua
21st-century Italian women politicians
Women members of the Chamber of Deputies (Italy)